Quevedo is a station of Line 2 of the Madrid Metro. It is named after Francisco de Quevedo, a Spanish writer.

History
The station was opened on 9 October 1929 on Line 2.

References

Line 2 (Madrid Metro) stations
Railway stations in Spain opened in 1925